Đorđević (also transliterated Djordjevic) is a Serbian surname, a patronymic derived from the given name Đorđe ("George", from Ancient Greek Georgios meaning "farmer"). It is predominantly worn by ethnic Serbs, an Eastern Orthodox Christian people.

Đorđević is the fifth most frequent surname in Serbia.

It may refer to:

Notable people 
 Aleksandar Đorđević (born 1967), retired Serbian professional basketball player and a present basketball
 Aleksandar Đorđević (footballer) (born 1968), football coach and former player
 Bojan Đorđević (born 1984), Serbian football player
 Bora Đorđević (born 1952), Serbian singer, songwriter and poet
 Boriša Đorđević (born 1953), retired Serbian football player
 Borivoje Đorđević (born 1948), retired Serbian football player
 Boško Đorđević (born 1953), retired Serbian football player
 Damien Djordjevic (born 1984), French figure skater
 Dragan Đorđević (born 1970), presidential candidate in the Serbian presidential election, 2004
 Filip Đorđević (born 1987), Serbian football player
 Jovan Đorđević (1826–1900), founder of the Novi Sad Serbian National Theatre and the National Theatre in Belgrade
 Kristijan Đorđević (born 1976), retired Serbian football player
 Manojle Đorđević (born 1979), From Subotica Serbia.Professional artist and rope access master.
 Marko Đorđević (footballer) (born 1983), Serbian football player
 Marko Đorđević (skier) (born 1978), Serbian alpine skier
 Milan Đorđević (born 1968), Serbian slalom canoer
 Nataša Đorđević, Serbian singer
 Nebojša Đorđević (born 1973), Serbian tennis player
 Nenad Đorđević (born 1979), Serbian football player
 Predrag Đorđević (born 1972), retired Serbian football player
 Puriša Đorđević (born 1924), Serbian film director and screenwriter
 Sanja Đorđević (born 1969), Montenegrin Serb singer
 Saša Đorđević (footballer) (born 1981), Serbian football player
 Slavoljub Đorđević (born 1981), Serbian football player
 Tatjana Đorđević (born 1985), Serbian singer
 Vladimir Đorđević (born 1982), Serbian football player
 Vlastimir Đorđević (born 1948), former Serbian colonel general
 Zoran Đorđević (football manager) (born 1952), Serbian football manager
 Zoran Đorđević (photographer) (born 1959), Serbian photographer
 Zoran Đorđević (politician) (born 1970), Serbian politician and former Minister of Defense (2016–2017)

See also 
 Đurđević (disambiguation), a surname
 Đorđić, a surname

References 

Serbian surnames
Patronymic surnames
Surnames from given names